Tereza Boučková (born 24 May 1957) is a Czech writer.

The daughter of playwright Pavel Kohout and  Anna Cornová, she was born in Prague, attended high school and studied English for a year after being rejected by the Drama Academy for political reasons. She signed Charter 77 and subsequently worked as a cleaner, postal worker and concierge. In 1985, she married Jiří Bouček.

She published her first prose work  Indiánský běh (Indian Run) in samizdat. It received the Jiří Orten Award in 1990. In 2006, she won first prize for her script Zemský ráj to napohled; she wrote the screenplay for the 2009 film of the same name directed by Irena Pavláskové with English title An Earthly Paradise for the Eyes.

Selected works 
  Křepelice (Quail), short fiction (1993)
 Když milujete muže (When You Love a Man), novella (1995)
 Krákorám (I’m Cawing), short stories (1998)

References

External links 

 

1957 births
Living people
Charter 77 signatories
Writers from Prague
21st-century Czech dramatists and playwrights
Czech women dramatists and playwrights
Czech women short story writers
Czech short story writers
21st-century Czech novelists
Czech women novelists
21st-century Czech women writers